Richard Lee may refer to:

Politicians
Sir Richard Lee (engineer) (1513–1575), military engineer and MP for Hertfordshire
Richard Lee (MP for Much Wenlock) (fl. 1501–1557), MP for Much Wenlock
Richard Lee (died 1608), English politician and ambassador to Russia
Richard Lee (MP for Rochester) (fl. 1621–1653), English politician, MP for Rochester
Sir Richard Lee, 2nd Baronet (c. 1600–1660), English politician 
Col. Richard Lee I (1617–1664), "the Immigrant", planter, trader, and Secretary of State, who emigrated from England to Virginia
Col. Richard Lee II (1647–1715), planter, Colonel of Horse, member of the King's Council
Richard "Squire" Lee (1726–1795), Virginian colonist and politician
Richard Henry Lee (1732–1794), president of the United States in Congress Assembled, 1784 to 1785
Richard Bland Lee (1761–1827), U.S. congressman from Virginia
Richard C. Lee (1916–2003), mayor of New Haven, Connecticut
Richard Lee (Canadian politician) (born 1954), BC Liberal MLA for Burnaby North

Sports
Richard Lee (cricketer, born 1950), Australian cricketer and businessman
Richard Lee (footballer) (born 1982), goalkeeper who plays for Brentford F.C.
Richard H. Lee (golfer) (born 1987), American golfer
Richard T. Lee (golfer) (born 1990), Canadian golfer
Richard Lee (cricketer, born 1833) (1833–1876), English cricketer who later assumed the name Richard Napoleon Thornton

Others
Richard Lee (Royal Navy officer) (c. 1765–1837), British admiral
Richard Borshay Lee (born 1937), Canadian anthropologist and author
Richard Lee (journalist) (born 1963), Seattle journalist and political candidate, best known for his theories about Kurt Cobain's death
Brandon Paris (Richard Lee, born 1971), Canadian rock singer
Richard Lee (activist) (born 1964), marijuana activist and founder of Oaksterdam University
Richard Lee (surgeon), American cardiac surgeon
Richard Charles Lee (1905–1983), Hong Kong businessman and philanthropist
R. C. T. Lee (Richard C. T. Lee, born 1939), Taiwanese computer scientist
SS Richard Henry Lee, a Liberty ship

See also
Ric Lee (born 1945), British rock drummer
Rich Lee (born 1978), American filmmaker
Dick Lee (disambiguation)
Rick Lee, former member of NYC band Skeleton Key
Ricky Lee (born 1948), Filipino screenwriter
Dickey Lee (born 1936), American singer/songwriter
Richard Leigh (disambiguation)
Richard Li (born 1966), Hong Kong businessman
Li Han-hsiang (1926–1996), known as Richard Li Han Hsiang, Chinese film director